This is a list of current national nature reserves in England. Sites formerly notified, such as Braunton Burrows in Devon, are not included.


Avon

Bedfordshire

Berkshire
 Chobham Common

Buckinghamshire
 Burnham Beeches

Cambridgeshire

Cheshire

Cleveland
 Teesmouth

Cornwall

Cumbria

Derbyshire

Devon

Dorset

Durham

East Riding of Yorkshire

East Sussex

Essex

Gloucestershire

Hampshire

Herefordshire

Hertfordshire
 Broxbourne Woods

Isle of Wight
 Newtown

Kent

Lancashire

Leicestershire

Lincolnshire

London

Merseyside

Norfolk

North Yorkshire

Northamptonshire

Northumberland

Nottinghamshire
 Sherwood Forest

Oxfordshire

Shropshire

Somerset

South Yorkshire
 Humberhead Peatlands

Staffordshire

Suffolk

Surrey

West Midlands

West Sussex

Wiltshire

Worcestershire

See also
National nature reserve (United Kingdom)
National nature reserves in Scotland
National nature reserves in Wales
Nature reserves in Northern Ireland

References